Metal Commando is the thirteenth studio album by German heavy metal band Primal Fear. The album was released on 24 July 2020 via Nuclear Blast. It is also the first album with drummer Michael Ehré.

Track listing

Personnel 
All information from the album booklet.

Primal Fear
 Ralf Scheepers – lead and backing vocals
 Mat Sinner – bass, vocals, producer
 Magnus Karlsson – guitars, keyboards
 Alex Beyrodt – guitars
 Tom Naumann – guitars
 Michael Ehré – drums

Production
 Jacob Hansen – engineering, mixing, mastering
 Stephan Lohrmann – cover art
 Stefan Heilemann – layout

Charts

References 

2020 albums
Nuclear Blast albums
Primal Fear (band) albums